An independent hardware vendor (IHV) is a company specializing in making or selling computer hardware, usually for niche markets.

See also
Independent software vendor
Software company

Computer industry
vendor